Paul Danan (born 2 July 1978) is an English actor who played Sol Patrick in the UK teen soap opera Hollyoaks between 1997 and 2001. In 2005, Danan appeared as a contestant on the first series of ITV's Celebrity Love Island, and returned for the second series in 2006.

Danan was also a contestant on the 20th season of Celebrity Big Brother that started on 1 August 2017.

Early life
Danan attended the Italia Conti Academy of Theatre Arts.

Television
In 1995 Danan played Melody's Agent Max Mitford in the CBBC series The Queen's Nose.

Between 1997 and 2001 he played Sol Patrick in the UK teen soap opera Hollyoaks.

In 2005 he appeared as a contestant on the first series of ITV's Celebrity Love Island.

He returned for the second series in 2006.

He appeared on series 5 of in Da Bungalow.
 
In 2006 he presented a television series entitled Test Drive My Girlfriend on ITV2. In September 2006, Danan appeared in the ITV2 series Calum, Fran and Dangerous Danan, in which he traveled from Texas to Los Angeles on America's U.S. Route 66 with Calum Best and Fran Cosgrave.

In 2009, Danan was a guest on series 1 and 2 of the Channel 4 sketch show The Kevin Bishop Show. From 2010 to 2011 he co-hosted Stars and Strikes for 4music with presenter Rick Edwards playing a ten-frame ten-pin bowling match against a popstar or group. In November 2012 Danan appeared in an episode of ITV drama Crime Stories. In 2015 he played the character Steve in the TV series Good Girls Club for Sky TV.

He competed in Celebrity Big Brother 20. On Day 18, he became the 5th evictee.

On an episode of The Jeremy Kyle Show broadcast on ITV in the United Kingdom on 9 February 2019, Danan discussed his substance addiction. He admitted to being a recovering addict.

In January 2022, he appeared on series 7 of E4's Celebrity Coach Trip in Northern Portugal, where he was put with Team GB athlete Ashley McKenzie. Danan and McKenzie joined a line-up which featured fellow celebrity travellers like Matt Richardson, Honey G, Ginny Lemon, pop duo Honeyz and Birds of a Feather stars Linda Robson and Lesley Joseph.

Stage
On stage, Danan played "the Monster" in Desires of Frankenstein by James Martin Charlton at the 2002 Edinburgh Festival Fringe.

In 2007, Danan was due to play Jack in Jack & the Beanstalk at the Preston Guild Hall, but he was sacked after swearing during the Christmas Lights switch on.

Personal life
Danan was born in Chigwell, Essex to a Moroccan Jewish family. His father was from Fez, Morocco. Danan now lives in Hertfordshire, running a drama club for local children. He has a son called Deniro who was born in September 2015.

Awards
In 2006 Danan was awarded a Loaded Laftas Comedy Award for funniest reality TV personality.

References

External links 

Living people
1978 births
20th-century British male actors
21st-century British male actors
Alumni of the Italia Conti Academy of Theatre Arts
People from Chigwell
Male actors from London
English male soap opera actors
British people of Moroccan-Jewish descent
English male stage actors